Boas might refer to:

Boidae, snakes
Boas' sign, pain below the right shoulder
BOAS is an acronym for Brachycephalic Obstructive Airway Syndrome

People with the surname
Abraham Tobias Boas (1844–1923), Australian rabbi 
André Vilas Boas (born 1983), Portuguese footballer
André Villas-Boas (born 1977), Portuguese football manager
Antonio Villas Boas (1934–1992), Brazilian alien abduction claimant
Benjamin Boas (born 1983), American writer and consultant on Japanese culture
Carlos Thorne Boas (born 1923), Peruvian novelist, writer and lawyer
Ernst Philip Boas (1891–1955), American physician
Franz Boas (1858–1942), German-American anthropologist and linguist
Franziska Boas (1902–1988), American choreographer, percussionist, and educator
Frederick S. Boas (1862–1957), English drama scholar
George Boas (1891–1980), American philosopher
Harold Boas (1883–1980), Australian town planner and architect
Harold P. Boas (born 1954), American mathematician
Ismar Isidor Boas (1858–1938), German gastroenterologist
Johan Erik Vesti Boas (1855–1935), Danish zoologist 
Kléber Boas (born 1975), Brazilian footballer
Marie Boas Hall (1919–2009), American historian of science, sister of Ralph, Jr
Mary L. Boas (1917–2010) American mathematician and physics teacher
Ralph P. Boas, Jr (1912–1992), American mathematician
Roger Boas (1921–2017), American politician

See also
 Boa (disambiguation)
 Boaz (disambiguation)